Pool A of the 2011 Rugby World Cup began on 9 September 2011 and was completed on 2 October. The pool was composed of hosts New Zealand, the fourth-placed team from 2007, France; as well as Canada, Japan and Tonga. One of the biggest shocks in the history of the tournament came when Tonga beat France by 19 points to 14. On 3 October, it was announced that New Zealand winger Richard Kahui had been voted the Player of Pool A.

Overall

All times are local New Zealand time (UTC+12 until 24 September, UTC+13 from 25 September)

New Zealand vs Tonga

France vs Japan

Tonga vs Canada

New Zealand vs Japan

France vs Canada

Tonga vs Japan

New Zealand vs France

Canada vs Japan

France vs Tonga

New Zealand vs Canada

References

External links

Pool A at rugbyworldcup.com

Pool A
2010–11 in French rugby union
2010–11 in Japanese rugby union
2011 in Canadian rugby union
Pool
2011 in Tongan rugby union